John Taylor (25 September 1942 – 17 July 2015) was a British jazz pianist, born in Manchester, England, who occasionally performed on the organ and the synthesizer.

Early life 
John Taylor was a self-taught pianist. With his family, he moved from Manchester, first to the Midlands and then to Hastings where he played locally. In 1964, Taylor became a civil servant, moved to London and became involved in the free jazz scene.

Performing career
Taylor first came to the attention of the jazz community in 1969, when he partnered with saxophonists Alan Skidmore and John Surman. He was later reunited with Surman in the short-lived group Morning Glory and, in the 1980s, with Miroslav Vitous's quartet.

In the early 1970s, Taylor was accompanist to the singer Cleo Laine and started to compose for his own sextet. He also worked with many visiting artists at Ronnie Scott's Jazz Club in London, and later became a member of Scott's quintet.

In 1977, Taylor formed the trio Azimuth, with Norma Winstone and Kenny Wheeler. On some of the group's recording Taylor played synthesiser and organ. The group was described by Richard Williams as "one of the most imaginatively conceived and delicately balanced contemporary chamber-jazz groups". The trio made several recordings for ECM Records and performed in Europe, the US and Canada.

The 1980s saw Taylor working with groups led by Jan Garbarek, Enrico Rava, Gil Evans, Lee Konitz and Charlie Mariano, as well as performing in duos with Tony Coe and Steve Argüelles. Composing projects included a commission for the English choir Cantamus Girls Choir with Lee Konitz and Steve Argüelles and pieces for the Hannover Radio Orchestra with Stan Sulzmann. Taylor also performed on David Sylvian's song "Laughter and Forgetting", on which Kenny Wheeler also featured.

From 2006, Taylor was a member of Kenny Wheeler's quartet and large ensemble and performed in duo and quartet settings with John Surman; their recording of Ambleside Days on ahum won critical acclaim. In 1996 Taylor played organ on Surman's choral work Proverbs and Songs from Salisbury Cathedral, later released on ECM Records. During the 1990s, he made several recordings also for ECM with Peter Erskine's trio with Palle Danielsson on bass.

In 2000, Taylor made a new collaboration with Azimuth and the Smith Quartet for the Weimer Festival. Also in that year, he recorded Verso with Maria Pia De Vito and Ralph Towner.

Taylor celebrated his 60th birthday in 2002 with a Contemporary Music Network Tour, in which he presented his new trio with drummer Joey Baron and Marc Johnson on bass. The tour also featured the Creative Jazz Orchestra playing Taylor's composition "The Green Man Suite". In July 2002, Taylor received the BBC Jazz Award for 'Best New Work' for this suite.

Taylor's trio recording with Johnson and Baron was released early in 2003, and September 2003 saw the release of his solo CD Insight on Sketch. John Fordham wrote in The Guardian: "This is one of contemporary jazz's great performers at work ... a beautiful solo statement by a very modest star." In 2004, Taylor recorded Where Do We Go from Here? in duo with Kenny Wheeler and Nightfall with bassist Charlie Haden. They subsequently performed at the Montreal International Jazz Festival. Also that year Taylor formed a new trio with Palle Danielsson and Martin France. They performed at the Vancouver Jazz Festival and recorded Angel of the Presence for CAM Jazz. This recording was released in January 2006 to coincide with their UK tour and has received critical acclaim.

Keyboard style
Whilst Taylor's unique piano style drew on the whole of the jazz pallette and considerable influence from classical music, his approach was characterised by a sophisticated and advanced rhythmic and harmonic sensibility. Rhythmically he specialised in asymmetrical meters and in employing "drumming" patterns on the keyboard. Harmonically, he significantly developed and expanded the harmonic vocabulary of musicians such as Bill Evans and Gil Evans.

Teaching
Taylor was professor of Jazz Piano at the Cologne College of Music from 1993 onwards, and became a Lecturer in jazz at University of York in 2005. He coached and taught undergraduate jazz musicians and was of central importance to the new master's degree jazz pathway and in advancing doctoral research and performance in jazz.

Family
Taylor was married to jazz vocalist Norma Winstone from 1972 until their divorce. The couple had two sons: Leo Taylor, a drummer with indie rock band The Invisible; and Alex Taylor, a singer-songwriter. John Taylor was married to Diana (née de Courcy) until her death in 2004 from cancer, and his subsequent marriage to childhood sweetheart Carol Weston, lasted for the rest of his life.

Death
Taylor died on 17 July 2015, following a heart attack he suffered while performing at the Saveurs Jazz Festival in Segré, France. Although he was resuscitated at the venue, he died after being taken to hospital.

Discography

As leader

With Norma Winstone and/or Kenny Wheeler

As co-leader and sideman
Line-ups in brackets indicate that names or format are not mentioned on the album front cover. Recordings with artists without wiki entry (for the most part), and the seldom guest appearances were not included. For initial alphabetical order of artists reload the page.

References

External links
 BBC review of  Rosslyn
 JazzTimes article

1942 births
2015 deaths
Musicians from Manchester
British jazz pianists
ECM Records artists
Nucleus (band) members
20th-century pianists
20th-century English musicians
Academics of the University of York
Azimuth (band) members
FMR Records artists
Edition Records artists